Probable ATP-dependent RNA helicase DDX59 is an enzyme that in humans is encoded by the DDX59 gene.

References

Further reading